Daniel Joseph Maslany is a Canadian actor, producer and composer. He is known for playing Bondurant Smit in CBC's offbeat and absurd comedy series Four in the Morning, Llewelynn Watts in the series Murdoch Mysteries and Townes Linderman in the series Impulse on YouTube Premium.

Early life 
Daniel Joseph Maslany was born in Regina, Saskatchewan, son of Daniel Maslany, a woodworker, and Renate (born Kratz), a French/English translator and interpreter. His older sister, Tatiana Gabriele, is an actress, and his younger brother, Michael is an animator. He has Austrian, German, Polish, Romanian, and Ukrainian ancestry. As a child he participated in drawing, dance, acting, and film-making classes. He is a graduate of the Globe Theatre Conservatory.

Career

Theatre 

The solo show, O.C.Dean, written and performed by Maslany, premiered at Globe Theatre in Regina in 2013 (Globe Theatre Shumiatcher Sandbox Series), then toured to Uno Fest in Victoria in 2014.

Maslany performed in the play Stupid Fucking Bird by Aaron Posner, and in particular for the Canadian premiere in 2013. He also produced the Video Trailer. He also worked as sound, music, projection designer and co-creator of A Date with the Night at Globe Theatre in 2015.

As an actor, Maslany has played parts in Robin Hood, Peter Pan, The Alice Nocturne, A Midsummer Night's Dream, George Dandin, and Pride and Prejudice at the Globe Theatre in Regina;  Rage, The Alice Nocturne, and The Story of Mr. Wright in the Globe Theatre Shumiatcher Sandbox Series; as well as Wrecked, and The Secret Life of the Octopus, as part of the Persephone Youth Tour. He also directed The Fusion Project: By Candlelight for the Globe Theatre Shumiatcher Sandbox Series.

Maslany designed the sound and music for Robin Hood and Metamorphoses at the Globe Theatre, as well as  Trout Stanley at The Storefront Theatre and Shannon 10:40 for Videofag.

Films/television 

Maslany made his on-screen debut in the 2000 film Skipped Parts, playing character Petey Pierce. He later appeared in several television series and films, including Renegadepress.com, Corner Gas, and Chained.

In 2016 he played Bondurant in the short-lived Toronto series Four in the Morning.

Joining the cast of the series Murdoch Mysteries in 2017, Maslany took on the character of Llewellyn Watts, a police detective.

He played Townes Linderman in the YouTube Premium series Impulse.

Other works 

Daniel Maslany worked as executive producer, second assistant director and composer for the short film, Shut Up (2019). He also composed the music of the short film, 90/91 (post-production).

Maslany has also been a Combat Improv performer.

Awards 

Maslany won the Regina's Mayor's Arts & Business Award for Emerging Artist in 2008.

Personal life 

Maslany lives in Toronto, Ontario with his wife, Lucy Adele Hill, actress and writer. He is allergic to almost all animals. During a game of broomball with his wife's family in Bladworth, Saskatchewan, Maslany injured his knee.

Filmography

References

External links
 

Living people
Canadian male composers
Canadian male web series actors
Canadian people of Ukrainian descent
Canadian people of Polish descent
Canadian people of German descent
Canadian people of Romanian descent
Male actors from Regina, Saskatchewan
Musicians from Regina, Saskatchewan
Canadian people of Austrian descent
Canadian male film actors
Canadian male television actors
Canadian male stage actors
21st-century Canadian male actors
21st-century Canadian composers
Year of birth missing (living people)